Kista Torn (in English, Kista Towers) is a pair of 19- and 40-storey apartment buildings, connected at their base. The towers are situated on Borgarfjordsgatan in the Kista district of Stockholm, Sweden. This feat is set to be matched by Norra Tornen in Hagastaden, upon completion of that project.

References

Buildings and structures in Stockholm
Skyscrapers in Sweden
Residential buildings completed in 2015